The Roman Catholic Diocese of Yan'an/Fushi is a diocese located in the city of Yan'an (Shaanxi) in the Ecclesiastical province of Xi'an in China.

History
 October 15, 1696: Established as the Apostolic Vicariate of Shensi 陝西 from the Diocese of Nanjing 南京
 1712: Renamed as Apostolic Vicariate of Shensi and Shansi 陝西山西
 March 2, 1844: Renamed as Apostolic Vicariate of Shensi 陝西
 August 2, 1887: Renamed as Apostolic Vicariate of Northern Shensi 陝西北境
 December 3, 1924: Renamed as Apostolic Vicariate of Yan'anfu 延安府
 April 11, 1946: Promoted as Diocese of Yan'an 延安

Leadership
 Bishops of Yan'an 延安 (Roman rite)
 Bishop John Baptist Yang Xiaoting (2011–present)
 Bishop Francis Tong Hui (1999 - 2011)
 Bishop Pacific Li Huan-de, O.F.M. (December 13, 1951 – 1973)
 Bishop Celestino Ibáñez y Aparicio, O.F.M. (April 11, 1946 – January 13, 1949)
 Vicars Apostolic of Yan’anfu 延安府 (Roman Rite)
 Bishop Celestino Ibáñez y Aparicio, O.F.M. (December 3, 1924 – April 11, 1946)
 Vicars Apostolic of Northern Shensi 陝西北境 (Roman Rite)
 Bishop Celestino Ibáñez y Aparicio, O.F.M. (April 12, 1911 – December 3, 1924)
 Bishop Auguste-Jean-Gabriel Maurice, O.F.M. (August 1, 1908 – April 12, 1911)
 Bishop Clemente Coltelli, O.F.M. (April 19, 1900 – January 28, 1901)
 Bishop Pasquale Pagnucci, O.F.M. (August 2, 1887 – January 29, 1901)
 Bishop Pio Vidi, O.F.M. (August 2, 1887 – April 19, 1900)
 Vicars Apostolic of Shensi 陝西 (Roman Rite)
 Bishop Pio Vidi, O.F.M. (August 24, 1886 – August 2, 1887)
 Bishop Pasquale Pagnucci, O.F.M. (April 12, 1884 – August 2, 1887)

References

 GCatholic.org
 Catholic Hierarchy

Roman Catholic dioceses in China
Christianity in Shaanxi
Yan'an
Religious organizations established in 1696
Roman Catholic dioceses and prelatures established in the 17th century
1696 establishments in Asia